The GLAAD Media Award for Outstanding Film – Limited Theatrical Release is an annual award that honors films that received a limited release for excellence in the depiction of LGBT (lesbian, gay, bisexual, and transgender) characters and themes. It is one of several categories of the annual GLAAD Media Awards, which are presented by GLAAD—an American non-governmental media monitoring organization—at ceremonies held primarily in New York City and Los Angeles between March and May.

The award was first given as Outstanding Independent Film at the 7th GLAAD Media Awards in 1996 to The Incredibly True Adventure of Two Girls in Love, where a clear distinction was made between films that received a limited release versus a wide release. It would be retitled to Outstanding Film – Limited Release during the following year. Previously, The Wedding Banquet was given a Vito Russo Film Award at the 5th GLAAD Media Awards in 1994, in a separate category from Outstanding Studio Film. GLAAD considers both The Wedding Banquet and The Incredibly True Adventure of Two Girls in Love as part of this category category. Due to the impact of the COVID-19 pandemic on cinema, during the ceremonies in 2021 and 2022, the category also included films supposed to receive a theatrical release, but ended up airing on television or streaming services instead. Starting with the 2023 ceremony, due to the reorganization of the categories, this award now excludes streaming films and was retitled to its current name.

For a film to be eligible, it must be released by a recognized film distribution company and play for paid admission in Los Angeles for seven consecutive days. Limited release is defined by a combination of criteria such as the numbers of screens, budget, and visibility. The award is given to the film and may be accepted by any of the producers, directors, writers, or actors. Limited-release films selected by GLAAD are evaluated based on four criteria: "Fair, Accurate, and Inclusive Representations" of the LGBT community, "Boldness and Originality" of the project, significant "Impact" on mainstream culture, and "Overall Quality" of the project.

GLAAD monitors mainstream media to identify which films will be nominated, while also issuing a call for entries that encourages media outlets to submit films for consideration. By contrast, in order for films created by and for LGBT audiences to be considered for nomination, they must be submitted after the call for entries. Winners are determined by a plurality vote by GLAAD staff and its board, Shareholders Circle members, volunteers and affiliated individuals. , the award has been given to 29 films. At the 33rd GLAAD Media Awards in 2022, the award was given to Parallel Mothers, distributed by Sony Pictures Classics.

Winners and nominees
Initially, GLAAD only revealed the winners at press releases, with the awards being given during the ceremonies. Starting with the 8th GLAAD Media Awards in 1997, the nominees in all categories were made public, with the winners being revealed during the ceremonies.

1990s

2000s

2010s

2020s

Notes

References

Awards for best film
Film Limited
LGBT film awards